"Nowadays" is a song by American rapper and singer Lil Skies featuring fellow American singer Landon Cube. It was released for digital download on December 17, 2017 as the second single from Skies' mixtape Life of a Dark Rose. The song is one of the two first Lil Skies songs (alongside "Red Roses", another collaboration with Landon Cube) to reach the US Billboard Hot 100, debuting at number 85 and peaking at number 55.

The sequel to the track, "Nowadays, Pt. 2" featuring Landon Cube was featured on Skies' sophomore studio album Shelby released on March 1, 2019.

Background
This song is about lil skies brake up with his bff claire 
echoing the distaste for a relationship as well as "fake friends" from his previous hit "Red Roses", Lil Skies and previous collaborator Landon Cube harmonize about their fast-paced living and achievements, presumably after their newfound fame, on an up-tempo CashMoneyAP production.

Music video
The music video was shot at Plano High School (Illinois). 
On December 17, 2017, Cole Bennett uploaded the music video for "Nowadays" on his YouTube account, Lyrical Lemonade. The music video has amassed over 309 million views, as of June, 2021.

The music video for the song, set in a high school and depicting Skies as a senior jock, is directed by Cole Bennett.

Track listing

Charts

Weekly charts

Year-end charts

Certifications

References

2017 singles
2017 songs
Atlantic Records singles
Lil Skies songs
Music videos directed by Cole Bennett
Songs written by CashMoneyAP
Songs written by Lil Skies
American contemporary R&B songs